Mišovice is a municipality and village in Písek District in the South Bohemian Region of the Czech Republic. It has about 300 inhabitants.

Administrative parts
Villages of Draheničky, Pohoří, Slavkovice and Svučice are administrative parts of Mišovice.

References

Villages in Písek District